KCWK (channel 9) is a defunct television station licensed to Walla Walla, Washington, United States. Owned by Pappas Telecasting, it was most recently affiliated with The CW, and had a low-power repeater (KCWK-LP, channel 27) in Yakima. The station went off the air on May 25, 2008.

History
The station went on air for the first time on March 23, 2001, as KBKI. In 2003, it changed its call sign to KAZW-TV and became affiliated with the Spanish-language Azteca América network. It was mainly targeted at the Hispanic community in Central Washington.

On April 24, 2006, it was announced that KAZW would launch a CW affiliate on digital subchannel 9.2, with programming being provided by The CW Plus. However, the station, which did not have a digital signal, subsequently changed its plans and chose to completely replace Azteca América with The CW, citing better marketing potential. Mike Angelos, Vice President of Corporate Communications for Pappas Telecasting, stated that while the Yakima Valley has a 40 percent Hispanic population, the numbers weren't high enough to reach the level needed for Azteca América. The call letters were changed to KCWK in August 2006 to reflect the new affiliation.

On May 10, 2008, KCWK, along with several other Pappas stations, filed for Chapter 11 bankruptcy. On May 25, 2008, the KCWK signal went off the air permanently; four days later, the station's offices were found to be empty, strongly indicating that KCWK had ceased operations.

On July 18, 2008, KCWK reported to the Federal Communications Commission (FCC) that digital television equipment needed in time for the upcoming 2009 digital transition had not yet been obtained, as this could not be done without prior approval of the bankruptcy court. The station had applied to extend the digital construction permit necessary to retain the broadcast license, but due to both equipment failure and financial hardship, it is expected that the station's currently silent analog signal will not return.

KCWK was one of two Pappas stations required to both end analog broadcasting and install new equipment to begin digital transmission (a flash-cut) on the 2009 DTV deadline. As full-service stations established after digital companion channels were assigned to existing full-service broadcasters, KCWK and Pappas-owned WWAZ-TV in Fond du Lac, Wisconsin had no existing digital transmitter facilities. KCWK remained silent, while Pappas negotiated several items with the FCC and ABC Owned Television Stations to allow WWAZ to return to the air eventually as WIWN while ABC's WLS-TV took its former digital channel slot to provide UHF digital television service to Chicago. All other full-service Pappas television stations had been simulcasting in both analog and digital formats long before the company entered chapter 11 bankruptcy and therefore had sufficient equipment on hand to continue to broadcast their signals digitally in 2009.

On January 16, 2009, it was announced that several Pappas stations, including the license for KCWK, would be sold to New World TV Group, after the sale received United States bankruptcy court approval. In the interim, Fisher Communications announced that their CBS affiliates KIMA-TV/KEPR-TV would each launch CW subchannels on March 31, 2009  to fill KCWK's void. Central Washington Charter Communications viewers received KTLA from Los Angeles as a temporary replacement after KCWK went silent; Dish Network viewers also received KTLA.

The KCWK license was canceled by the FCC on June 2, 2009, and the KCWK-LP license was later deleted. As a result, the new CW Plus digital subchannels of KIMA-TV and KEPR-TV became long-term.

Despite having ceased broadcasting on May 25, 2008, KCWK's website remained operational for two years afterwards.

Digital television
The station did not receive a companion channel for a digital television station, because it was granted an original construction permit after the FCC finalized the DTV allotment plan on April 21, 1997. Instead, KCWK would have been required to turn off its analog signal and turn on its digital signal (called a "flash-cut") on or before the 2009 end of the digital TV conversion period for full-service stations. As KCWK did not acquire its digital transmitter and antenna, it was unable to complete the mandatory digital transition and never resumed broadcasting.

Low-powered satellite KCWK-LP had voluntarily filed for a digital "-LD" license on channel 36. That application has since been deleted from the FCC database.

Translators
KCWK-LP 27 Yakima

References

Companies that filed for Chapter 11 bankruptcy in 2008
Defunct television stations in the United States
CWK
Television channels and stations established in 2001
2001 establishments in Washington (state)
Television channels and stations disestablished in 2008
2008 disestablishments in Washington (state)
Walla Walla, Washington
CWK